"As Long as You Love Me" is a song by American boy band Backstreet Boys, from the group's eponymous debut studio album in the United States, Backstreet Boys (1997), and their second studio album worldwide, Backstreet's Back (1997). The song was written by Max Martin who produced it with Kristian Lundin, and lyrically describes the reciprocity of a relationship. "As Long as You Love Me" was released by Jive Records as the second single from both albums in the United Kingdom on September 29, 1997, and in the United States on October 7, 1997. The song received generally positive reviews from music critics, who praised the production.

"As Long as You Love Me" topped the charts in Lithuania, New Zealand, the Philippines and Romania, and peaked at number two in Australia and Austria, number three in Canada and the United Kingdom, number four in Switzerland and Sweden, and number five in the Netherlands and Norway. An accompanying music video was directed by British director Nigel Dick and depicts the Backstreet Boys performing an audition for six women.

Background
In an interview with Billboard, AJ McLean noted that he was initially meant to sing the song's bridge, while Brian Littrell and Nick Carter would both sing the verses. However, he had been infected with strep throat, and was subsequently replaced with Littrell, whose vocals were featured on the album and single. The song was a last-minute addition to the album, as Clive Calder, then-chairman of Zomba, heard the song and called Jive Records president Barry Weiss, who then contacted the band's manager, Johnny Wright.

The single version of "As Long as You Love Me" has different instrumentation and mixing as well as a slightly different structure. This version was included on the 1998 second pressing of their US debut album.

Critical reception
Stephen Thomas Erlewine from AllMusic stated that "As Long as You Love Me" "would have sounded perfect in any era". He also praised the song's slick production, which he described "as irresistible as teen pop can be". John Dingwall from Daily Record stated that the song reminded him of "the 90s New Kids On The Block". A reviewer from Music Week rated it four out of five, adding, "This bears many similarities to Boyzone's trademark mid-tempo ballad sound and will be another big step in the US fivesome's bid to match their Irish counterparts in the boy band big league." Chuck Arnold from People Magazine viewed it as their "sumptuous signature song", noting that it "is about leaving your life in the hands of that special someone — on just the one condition that they love you back. Sounds like a deal."

Commercial performance
"As Long as You Love Me" was never released as a commercial single in the US but became an MTV staple and radio airplay hit. It spent 56 weeks on the US Billboard Hot 100 Airplay chart, peaking at #4.

The single has sold over 530,000 copies in the United Kingdom.

Music video

Background

The accompanying music video for "As Long as You Love Me" was directed by British director Nigel Dick and filmed on June 15, 1997, in Pasadena, California. AJ McLean learned the lyrics of the song on the day of the shoot, as he was initially meant to sing the song's bridge. Six women were chosen for the video, with the number chosen to ensure that they would not appear to be matched up with the band members. One of the women, Donna, was played by Leighanne Wallace, whom Littrell ultimately married in 2000.

Synopsis
The music video begins with the Backstreet Boys auditioning before six women. The women named Donna, Jana, Linda, Fatima, Gina, and Nina videotape the performances and take notes. The band members primarily sing and dance, with each member performing in a short "screen test" vignette in which they dress up in a costume and perform various unusual activities. During the bridge, they switch places with the women and have them perform screen tests. The positions reverse again towards the end of the song. The choreography uses folding chairs. There are special effects utilized in the video, most notably morphing sequences, where the face of one member morphs into another's. There are also quick dissolves or straight cuts between footage of the members each doing the chair routine in the same exact position of the set. The cuts cause a working fan in the background to appear to stutter in its spin.

Cover versions
The Netherlands retro rock band The Kik recorded a live version in Dutch ("Als jij maar van mij houdt") in the 3FM studio, using only CASIO keyboards. Radio DJ Giel Beelen subsequently asked the band to release their version as a single.

In 2019, the duo La Folie and singer Jordi Ninus recorded a version in Catalan of this song, under the title "Si em dius que m’estimes" ("If you say you love me"), for the CD edited by La Marató de TV3, a telethon devoted to raise funds for the research of incurable diseases.

Track listings
 UK 7-inch single
A. "As Long as You Love Me"
B. "Every Time I Close My Eyes"

 UK and European CD1
 "As Long as You Love Me" (radio version) – 3:32
 "Quit Playing Games (with My Heart)" (E-SMOOVE vocal mix) – 6:48
 "Everybody (Backstreet's Back)" (Funked Up mix) – 7:13
 "Every Time I Close My Eyes" – 3:55

 UK and European CD2
 "As Long as You Love Me" (radio version) – 3:32
 "As Long as You Love Me" (unplugged version) – 3:32
 "As Long as You Love Me" (instrumental) – 3:30

Charts

Weekly charts

Year-end charts

Certifications

Release history

References

1990s ballads
1997 singles
1997 songs
Backstreet Boys songs
Jive Records singles
Music videos directed by Nigel Dick
Pop ballads
Number-one singles in New Zealand
Number-one singles in Romania
Song recordings produced by Max Martin
Songs written by Max Martin
UK Independent Singles Chart number-one singles